The Wings of Change Tsunami is an Austrian single-place paraglider that was designed by Markus Gründhammer and produced by Wings of Change of Fulpmes. It is now out of production.

Design and development
The Tsunami was designed as a performance glider. Gründhammer describes his design, "as a soft performance glider...[with the] launch characteristics of a DHV 1 glider and flight characteristics of a competition glider".

The models are each named for their relative size.

Variants
Tsunami S
Small-sized model for lighter pilots. The glider model is Deutscher Hängegleiterverband e.V. (DHV) LTF/EN D certified.
Tsunami M
Mid-sized model for medium-weight pilots. The glider model is DHV LTF/EN D certified.
Tsunami L
Large-sized model for heavier pilots. The glider model is DHV LTF/EN D certified.

Specifications (Tsunami M)

References

External links

Tsunami
Paragliders